Oxygène 3 is the nineteenth studio album by the French electronic musician and composer Jean-Michel Jarre. Announced via a post on Jarre's Instagram account, the album was released on 2 December 2016, on the 40th anniversary of the original Oxygène album.

Background
In 1997, another sequel Oxygène 7-13 was released in the 20th anniversary to the 1976 album Oxygène. During the recording of his 2015 album Electronica 1: The Time Machine, Jarre composed a piece of music (later titled "Oxygene 19") that "made me think about what Oxygene could be if I was composing it today." In a interview with Billboard he stated: "What made the first Oxygene so different at the time, is probably the minimalist aspect, and the fact that there are almost no drums, and I wanted to keep this approach, creating the groove mainly with the sequences and the structure of the melodies only".

Recording 
The 1976 album was made on an 8-track multitrack with very few instruments. "I tried to keep this minimalist approach for Oxygene 3," Jarre stated. Jarre also stated that the album is separated into two distinct "light and dark" sides. "Oxygène (Part 20)" samples "Oxygène (Part VI)" from the original album within the sounds of wind and white noise that play at the beginning of the track. The album was recorded in just six weeks and mixed by Jarre using the Ableton Live audio software.

Artwork 
The album cover features a 3D model that recreates the original Michel Granger design used for the 1976 album. For the cover, Jarre asked Granger for permission to make a model based in his artwork, but from another angle. According Jarre the artwork is "an ecological warning signal, dark and surreal, evoking both outer space and that of our vital living space." He also added that "become inseparable from the music."

Release
Oxygène 3 was released in December 2, 2016 on Sony and Columbia labels, celebrating the 40th anniversary of the original Oxygène album. The album's first single was "Oxygene (Part 17)" and had a music video that combined live footage from the "Electronic World Tour" with "truly otherworldly" clips. It was released as a standalone album on digital download, CD, and LP, as well as in the Oxygène Trilogy package that brings together the three volumes of the Oxygène series and contains a coffee-table book.

Critical reception 

Paul Simpson of AllMusic commented that "it's rich and adventurous but it never goes over the top, which is a relief." Mike Barnes of LouderSound wrote that "Oxygene 3 is a resounding success and shouldn't be seen as an exercise in fame by association with their own work, an extension of the 'brand', which was a sentiment that hung quite a lot about Tubular Bells II  by Mike Oldfield and Thick as a Brick 2 by Ian Anderson". Nina Corocan of Consequence stated that "while full of good intentions, the album never quite finds its footing over the course of its seven tracks, inevitably failing to deliver a cohesive tone." 

The Spill Magazine stated that "this album is full of unusual melodies that create emotions, and at times while listening oxygen begins to disappear in the room." In The Skinny, Gary Kaill rated it as "a minimalist — and exquisitely melancholy — wonder." John Paul of Spectrum Culture commented that "while not nearly the revolutionary release its predecessor was some 40 years ago, Oxygene 3 helps to reaffirm Jarre's place in the increasingly crowded world of minimalist electronic music that he helped pioneer." Thomas H Green of The Arts Desk wrote that "he retains the stripped-back, wafting instrumental prog-pop vibe of the album's predecessors, although the main indication it's an Oxygene album is the endless stoner-friendly wind noise whooshing smeared liberally over everyhing." 

Financial Times writer Ludovic Hunter-Tilney described as "an ornate and luxuriant tribute to the analogue tones of vintage synthesisers, an artfully arranged constellation of electronic chimes, bleeps and whooshes." Fredrik Schlatta Wik of Release Magazine wrote that "the whole album lacks oxygen (pun intended). The sounds are fantastic, almost as a display of Jarre preset, but the lack of Jarresque melody, structure and build up is borderline annoying. Also despite being quite minimalistic, I found the mix and mastering a bit cluttered here, quite strained on at times and on fwe occasions and not overly pleasant to listen to."

Track listing
All tracks written by Jean-Michel Jarre.

Equipment
Adapted from liner notes of this album in vinyl:

 Eminent 310 
 EMS Synthi AKS
 Small Stone Electro-Harmonix
 Electric Mistress
 ARP 2500
 ARP 2600 
 Moog Sub 37 
 Dave Smith Instruments OB6
 Mellotron D4000
 Korg Polyphonic Ensemble P
 Korg Mini Pops 
 Metasonic
 Digisequencer 
 Roland TR-808
 Animoog
 Teenage Engineering OP-1 
 PO-12 Rhythm 
 OP 24
 Ochord
 Elektron Analog Keys 
 Access Virus
 Synapse Audio Software Dune VST
 Nord Lead 1
 Monark
 RBlocks
 Spire
 Serum
 Cognosphere
 Moog Taurus 1
 Micro Monsta
 Philicorda 
 Spectrasonics Omnisphere 2
 Spectrasonics StyusRMX

Charts

References

Jean-Michel Jarre albums
2016 albums
Sequel albums